Benjamin Morrell writes that he landed on an island he called Byers's Island, on 12th July 1825.  According to Morrell, this island was at a position of 28 degrees 32 minutes North, and 177 degrees 4 minutes East.  He writes about this, in his book A narrative of four voyages.

This island is a phantom island, and does not exist. Just before, he visited Pearl and Hermes Reef, and gives exact positions for the reef. It can therefore be excluded that he landed on Kure Atoll and gave a wrong position for it.

Byers is the name of the owner of the ship, and one of Morrell's employers. This is another hint that Morrell may be the source of the hoax. According to Burton R. Pollin, Morrell's ghostwriter was the magazine editor and playwright Samuel Woodworth.

So even though Morrell may not be the source of this and other false items in his work, he certainly knew about them. He knew about the "rectified" content of his book.

Morrell sacrificed his scientific reputation in order to be able to increase the sales of his book.

The official maritime manual of 1899 already lists Byer island and Morrell Island as doubtful.

Despite this, globes of 1960s still show the islands, along four other phantom islands, northwest of Kure.

Reference works 

 Henry M. Stommel: Lost Islands. The Story of Islands That Have Vanished from Nautical Charts. University of British Columbia Press, Vancouver 1984, ISBN 978-0-7748-0210-9 .

References 

Phantom islands
Northwestern Hawaiian Islands